The Men's 1500 metre freestyle competition at the 2017 World Championships was held on 29 and 30 July 2017.

Records
Prior to the competition, the existing world and championship records were as follows.

Results

Heats
The heats were held on 29 July at 10:44.

Final
The final was held on 30 July at 18:38.

References

Men's 1500 metre freestyle